The Bayer designation Upsilon Cancri (υ Cnc / υ Cancri) is shared by two stars, in the constellation Cancer:
 υ1 Cancri
 υ2 Cancri
They are separated by 0.34° on the sky.

Cancer (constellation)
Cancri, Upsilon